Wheeler & Runge was an American architectural partnership based in Charlotte, North Carolina.  The series of partnerships formed by Oliver Duke Wheeler also included Wheeler, Runge & Dickey. and Wheeler & Stern.

Principals included Wheeler, Neil Runge, and D. Anderson Dickey.  The firms formed by Wheeler have been collectively called "one of the most prolific firms in the courthouse business."

Earlier in his career, Wheeler was a partner in Hayden, Wheeler, and Schwend with Luke Hayden (architect) and Louis E. Schwend.

Work
Ashe County Courthouse, Main St. Jefferson, NC (Wheeler & Runge), NRHP-listed
Avery County Courthouse, Montezuma St. and Courthouse Dr. Newland, NC (Wheeler & Runge), NRHP-listed
Avery County Jail, 1829 Schultz Cir. Newland, NC (Wheeler & Runge), NRHP-listed
Caldwell County Courthouse, Main St. Lenoir, NC (Wheeler & Runge), NRHP-listed
Randolph County Courthouse, Worth St. Asheboro, NC (Wheeler, Runge & Dickey), NRHP-listed
Stokes County Courthouse, Main St. between North St. and Courthouse Rd. Danbury, NC (Wheeler & Runge), NRHP-listed
Wilkes County Courthouse, E. Main St. between Bridge and Broad Sts. Wilkesboro, NC (Wheeler & Runge), NRHP-listed  The building is a 1902 Beaux-Arts/Classical Revival style building.  The building with its "tetrastyle Ionic portico and Second Empire cupola dominates the Courthouse Square and its surroundings and serves as a major landmark in the town as well as in Wilkes County."  It is a contributing building in the Downtown Wilkesboro Historic District.
 Watauga County Court House, West King Street, Boone, NC. Built in 1904 using the same basic plan and design as Avery, Ashe, and Wilkes. Building was demolished in 1967.

Other works involving Oliver Wheeler include:
Central School, 303 McRae St. Laurinburg, NC (Wheeler, Oliver Duke), NRHP-listed
Grace A.M.E. Zion Church, 219-223 S. Brevard St. Charlotte, NC (Hayden, Wheeler and Schwend), NRHP-listed
Halifax County Courthouse, Main St. Halifax, NC (Wheeler & Stern), NRHP-listed
Iredell County Courthouse, S. Center St. between W. Prospect St. and Court Pl. Statesville, NC (Hayden, Wheeler & Schwend), NRHP-listed
Monroe Residential Historic District, Roughly bounded by Hough, Franklin, Jefferson, McCarten, Windsor, Sanford, Washington. Braden, Church & Hudson Sts. Monroe, NC (Wheeler & Stern), NRHP-listed
One or more works in Oakwood Historic District, roughly bounded by Oakwood Cemetery and Fourth Ave. NW, Fourth St. NW, Second Ave. NW, and Sixth St. NW Hickory, NC (Wheeler & Stearn), NRHP-listed
Wadesboro Downtown Historic District, Roughly bounded by Martin, Rutherford, Morgan, Lee, and Brent Sts. Wadesboro, NC (Wheeler & Stern), NRHP-listed

See also
Academy of Music, Broad and Locust Sts. Philadelphia, PA Lebrun & Runge, designed by Napoleon LeBrun & Gustavus Runge.

References

Architecture firms based in North Carolina